Espeland is a Norwegian surname. Notable people with the surname include:

Arne Espeland (1885–1972), Norwegian writer
Stefan Espeland (born 1989), Norwegian ice hockey player

Norwegian-language surnames